The 2003 Asian Cycling Championships took place at Changwon, South Korea from 4 to 13 August 2003.

Medal summary

Road

Men

Women

Track

Men

Women

Medal table

References

External links
 www.cycling.or.kr

Asia
Asia
Cycling
Asian Cycling Championships
International cycle races hosted by South Korea
Sport in Changwon